Todd Hank Hons (born September 5, 1961) is a former American football quarterback in the National Football League and Arena Football League. He played for the Detroit Lions and Detroit Drive. He played college football for the Arizona State Sun Devils.

References

1961 births
Living people
American football quarterbacks
Detroit Lions players
Detroit Drive players
Arizona State Sun Devils football players
Players of American football from Torrance, California
National Football League replacement players